This is a list of all tornadoes that were confirmed by local offices of the National Weather Service in the United States in April 2010.

United States yearly total

April

Note: 3 tornadoes were confirmed in the final totals, but do not have a listed rating.

April 4 event

April 5 event

April 7 event

April 8 event

April 12 event

April 13 event

April 17 event

April 20 event

April 21 event

April 22 event

April 23 event

April 24 event

April 25 event

April 26 event

April 29 event

April 30 event

See also
Tornadoes of 2010

Notes

References

 04
2010, 04
Tornadoes